Pimps Up, Ho's Down is a 1998 television documentary about pimping in the United States as part of the HBO documentary anthology series America Undercover. The film features interviews with American pimps and explores the modern pimping lifestyle. The film has received some controversy over some pimps using the documentary as an instructional video for their prostitutes, and HBO paying the pimps for rights to film their businesses and the Players Ball.

See also
American Pimp

References

External links

Summary at Fandango

1998 films
Documentary films about prostitution in the United States
American documentary films
1990s English-language films
1990s American films